The Maple Mountains, Javornik Mountains, or Javorniks (Czech and Slovak: Javorníky) are a mountain range of the Slovak-Moravian Carpathians that forms part of the border between the Czech Republic and Slovakia. 

The range stretches from the White Carpathians in the south to the Beskids in the north. The range divides the Bečva and Oder river systems from those of the Turiec and Váh along the European Watershed. Part of the range falls within the Slovak Kysuce Protected Landscape Area.

References

Mountain ranges of the Western Carpathians
Mountain ranges of Slovakia
Mountain ranges of the Czech Republic